An Ember in the Ashes is a fantasy novel written by American author Sabaa Tahir. It was published on April 28, 2015 by Razorbill, an imprint of Penguin Random House. It is the first book in the An Ember in the Ashes series, followed by A Torch Against the Night. In a fantasy world inspired by Ancient Rome, the story follows a girl named Laia spying for rebels against the reigning empire in exchange for their help in rescuing her captive brother; and a boy named Elias struggling to free himself from being an enforcer of a tyrannical regime. The novel is narrated in the first-person, alternating between the points of view of Laia and Elias.

The book was a New York Times, USA Today and international bestseller. International translation rights have been sold in 30 countries as of October 2015.

Plot
A Scholar girl by the name of Laia lives in the Martial Empire with her grandparents and brother Darin in the city of Serra. Their existence is a grueling one as they are seen as second-class citizens by the ruling Martial elite. Darin is arrested by Martial forces and accused of being an anti-Empire rebel. Laia seeks out the help of the anti-Empire group called the Resistance, and agrees to infiltrate an infamous military school for them if they help her break her brother free from prison.

At the school, called Blackcliff Academy, Laia meets a student named Elias Veturius. Along with his best friend Helene Aquilla and his two rivals Marcus and Zak Farrar, he has been chosen to take the Trials, a series of tests that will decide who the next ruler of the Empire is. But Elias has no wish to take the tests, or be ruler. He wants to escape the Empire.

When Elias meets Laia, the two realize that their destinies are more intertwined than they could have ever dreamed.

Background
Five hundred years ago, a warrior named Taius led the Martial clans to take over the Scholar Empire. He named himself Emperor and established his dynasty. He was called the Masked One, for the unearthly silver mask he wore to scare his enemies and the silver scims he battled with. His legends live on in Blackcliff Academy, a school built to prepare and identify the future Emperor; now a training ground for the Empire’s deadliest soldiers—the silver-faced Masks.

Factions
Scholars – The Scholars are a race of oppressed individuals who once ruled the land that has since been occupied by the Martial Empire. Many Scholars are enslaved by the Martials, and those who are not enslaved live a difficult, poverty-stricken life. The Resistance is a secretive group made up of Scholars seeking to overthrow the Empire.

Masks – "Named for the eerie silver masks that cover their faces, these soldiers are the Martial Empire’s most ruthless enforcers. They fight with speed and skill that is almost inhuman. Martial children destined for Maskhood are taken from their families at the age of 6, and trained at Blackcliff Military Academy for 14 years."

Tribes – The Tribes are a group of nomads inspired by the Bedouin tribes of North Africa.

Resistance – The Resistance is a band of Scholars that work in secret to overthrow the Empire. The Resistance leaders are the best and the bravest of the Scholars. Elusive as the rebels are, they’re the only weapon the Scholars have against the Empire and its soldiers.

Augurs – "The Augurs are a group of 14 Martial holy men and women who are believed to be immortal, and who are revered as advisors and seers."

Characters
Laia – Laia is described on the official An Ember in the Ashes web site as "a Scholar living with her grandparents and brother under the brutal rule of the Martial Empire. She and her family eke out an existence in the Empire’s impoverished backstreets, trying their best not to draw attention to themselves. But one night, Empire soldiers raid Laia’s home—and life as she knows it changes forever."

Darin – Laia's brother is older by two years, apprentice to Spiro Teluman, and designs his own weapons

Elias – This character is described as "the finest soldier at Blackcliff Military Academy—but secretly, its most unwilling. The scion of one of the Empire’s finest families, Elias wants only to be free from the tyranny he’s being trained to enforce."

Helene – Helene Aquilla is Blackcliff Academy's only female student and also best friend to Elias.

Commandant – The Commandant is the cruel head of the military academy, Blackcliff, as well as the mother of Elias, and is considered "one of the most powerful people in the Empire."

Marcus – Marcus an ignorant soldier in Blackcliff who was one of the four chosen for the trials, becoming emperor at the end."

Zacharias – He was the twin brother of Marcus Farrar. "

Development
Tahir formed the idea for An Ember in the Ashes in 2007 and wrote the book over a period of six years. She cites her hometown Ridgecrest in the Mojave Desert, as well as music as inspirations. While working at The Washington Post, Tahir read an article about Kashmiri women whose male family members were kidnapped by the military and never returned. She asked herself what she would do if she were one of those women. The book's Martial Empire system is based on the social stratification of ancient Rome.

The book's success led to the acquisition of a sequel almost immediately after its release. The sequel, entitled A Torch Against the Night, was released in August 2017. The third book, A Reaper at the Gates, was published on June 12, 2018. The fourth and final book, A Sky Beyond the Storm, was published on December 1, 2020. A trilogy of prequel graphic novels to the series is set to be published by Boom! Studios. Its first installment, A Thief Among the Trees, co-written by Tahir and Nicole Andelfinger with art by Sonia Liao was released on July 14, 2020.

Reception

Critical response and sales
An Ember in the Ashes debuted at #2 on the Young Adult New York Times Best Seller list. It debuted at #64 on the USA Today Best-Selling Books list. It was included in the Time (magazine) The 100 Best Fantasy Books of all Time  as well as in the Time (magazine) The 100 Best YA Books of all Time. 

It has garnered generally positive reviews. The Huffington Post said "An Ember in the Ashes glows, burns, and smolders—as beautiful and radiant as it is searing." Amazon named it one of the best books of May, as well as the best young adult book of 2015 and the fourth best book of the year. The New York Times called it "a worthy novel—and one as brave as its characters". However, the Chicago Tribune found that "the characters never fully spring to life under the author's ever-present hand." CNN included the book in the list of best summer beach reads. Publishers Weekly starred review called Tahir's debut "deft and polished" and the story "brimming with political intrigue". Time (magazine) called it a "bruising ... young adult novel".

Awards and nominations

Film adaptation
Film rights were optioned by Paramount Pictures in a seven-figure deal in 2014, well before the book's publication, and Mark Johnson (Breaking Bad, Chronicles of Narnia) has signed on to produce the film.

References

2015 fantasy novels
2015 American novels
American fantasy novels
Pakistani-American novels
Razorbill books